Sylvia Kajoeramari is a Surinamese politician.  She was a member of the National Assembly from 2005 to 2010, representing Marowijne District for the Pertjajah Luhur (PL) party.

Biography 
Kajoeramari is from the village of Galibi in Marowijne District.  She is of Kalina origin.

During the 2005 elections, Kajoeramari was a candidate of the Pertjajah Luhur (PL) party, which was then part of the New Front alliance.  She won a seat in the National Assembly for the 2005-2010 term.  She advocated to establish the International Day of the World's Indigenous Peoples (proposed by the United Nations in 1994) as an official Surinamese public holiday.  President Ronald Venetiaan declared its observance in 2006.

Her brother Ramses Kajoeramari, a former village chief, was also elected to the National Assembly (2010-2015).  In 2014, she made the switch from the PL to the General Liberation and Development Party (ABOP).

References 

Living people
Surinamese people of indigenous peoples descent
Indigenous politicians of the Americas
Pertjajah Luhur politicians
General Liberation and Development Party politicians
Members of the National Assembly (Suriname)
People from Marowijne District
Surinamese politicians
21st-century Surinamese politicians
Year of birth missing (living people)
21st-century Surinamese women politicians